The Jamaica Journal is a peer-reviewed academic journal published by the Institute of Jamaica. It publishes scholarly articles on the history, natural history, art, literature, music, and culture of Jamaica.

Its predecessor was the Journal of the Institute of Jamaica, established in 1896. In 1967, the Jamaica Journal was established  as a quarterly journal, "to reflect the Institute's interest in the development and promotion of Jamaica's history, literature, science and arts". In 2002, the journal temporarily ceased publication; it was relaunched in 2004 under a new editor-in-chief, Kim Robinson-Walcott.

Abstracting and indexing
The journal is abstracted and indexed in America: History and Life, Historical Abstracts, International Bibliography of the Social Sciences, and the Modern Language Association Database.

References

External links

Institute of Jamaica
Older issues at the Digital Library of the Caribbean

Caribbean studies journals
Publications established in 1896
Quarterly journals
English-language journals
Works about Jamaica